Hong Kong Bronx is a 2008 Hong Kong action film directed by Billy Chung, and starring Jordan Chan and Annie Man. The film was produced by Wong Jing, whose father, Wong Tin-Lam, appears in a supporting role.

Plot
Neil is a former Triad boss, who has just been released from prison. He attempts to starts his life anew by being a parental guide to his two sisters (Ada Wong, Vonnie Lui) and opening a repair shop. However, Neil meets Johnny a local merciless Triad kingpin.

Cast
Jordan Chan as Neil Shek
Timmy Hung as Fai
Kenny Wong as Bull
Annie Man as Miss Watt
Winnie Leung as Mabel
Ricky Chan as Johnny
Zuki Lee as Yo Yo
Vonnie Lui as Bonnie
Chan Hung Lit as SP Cheung
Ada Wong Ji-Haam as Barbie
Wong Tin-Lam as Uncle Bo
Alan Chui Chung-San as Uncle Man

Reception

Critical reception
Hong Kong Bronx was a seen by some critics as a retread of the Triad film genre. LoveHKFilm.com called it a "surprisingly watchable guilty pleasure,"  and criticized the film for its cheesy use of CGI blood.

Box office
Hong Kong Bronx was given a limited release in Hong Kong on 29 January 2008. It was shown in five theaters.

References

External links 
 

2008 films
Triad films
2000s Cantonese-language films
China Star Entertainment Group films
2008 action films
Hong Kong action films
2000s Hong Kong films